James or Jim Owens may refer to:

Sports
 Jesse Owens (James Cleveland Owens; 1913–1980), American track and field athlete, and Olympian
 James Owens (American football, born 1955), American football player and Olympic athlete
 James Owens (American football coach) (1951–2016), American football player and coach
 Jim Owens (1927–2009), head football coach at the University of Washington (1957–1974)
 Jim Owens (baseball) (1934–2020), American baseball pitcher
 Jim Owens (basketball, born 1950), American basketball player
 Red Owens (James L. Owens; 1925–1988), American basketball player
 James Owens (referee) (born 1977), Irish hurling referee

Politics and military
 James Byeram Owens (1816–1889), Confederate politician
 James W. Owens (congressman) (1837–1900), US Representative from Ohio
 James C. Owens Jr. (1910–1942), American naval aviator
 James Owens (VC) (1829–1901), Irish soldier and recipient of the Victoria Cross
 James Lawrence Owens (1899–1960), Alberta provincial MLA

Other
 James B. Owens (1920–2009), American engineer and executive
 James W. Owens, chairman and CEO of Caterpillar
 James Owens, lead plaintiff in a civil suit against Sudan for its role in the 1998 United States embassy bombings that led to an award of over $10 billion in damages

See also
 USS James C. Owens (DD-776), US Navy destroyer
 Jimmy Owens (disambiguation)
 James Owen (disambiguation)